Michael Molloy (1850 – 12 January 1926) was an Irish nationalist politician and Member of Parliament (MP) from 1910 to 1918, taking his seat in the House of Commons of the United Kingdom of Great Britain and Ireland.

Molloy, chairman of Carlow Urban Council, was nominated as candidate for the Irish Parliamentary Party in the constituency of Carlow County at the general election of January 1910, replacing Walter MacMurrough Kavanagh, who was standing down. He was elected unopposed, and again in the December general election of the same year. He did not run in the 1918 general election, and his seat was taken, unopposed, by James Lennon of Sinn Féin.

References

External links 
 

1850 births
1926 deaths
Irish Parliamentary Party MPs
Members of the Parliament of the United Kingdom for County Carlow constituencies (1801–1922)
UK MPs 1910
UK MPs 1910–1918